Nomreh Yek-e Bala (also Romanized as Nomreh Yek-e Bālā; also known as Āyatollāh Montaz̧erī-ye Bālā and Nomreh Yek) is a village in Chah Salem Rural District, in the Central District of Omidiyeh County, Khuzestan Province, Iran. At the 2006 census, its population was 546, in 123 families.

References 

Populated places in Omidiyeh County